Seven Seas Mariner is a cruise ship operated by Regent Seven Seas Cruises (formerly Radisson Seven Seas Cruises). She was the first all-suite, all-balcony ship in the world, and was awarded "Ship of the Year" in 2002 by Ocean and Cruise News. Also, she was the first to offer dining by the famous Le Cordon Bleu of Paris in one of the onboard restaurants. Her staff to guest ratio is 1 to 1.6.

In 2009, Seven Seas Mariner made the news when it rescued an around-the-world-sailor from a crippled sailing yacht west of New Zealand.

In March 2022, the ship was almost hit by a tornado as it departed the port of New Orleans. No damage or casualties were reported.

References

Notes

Bibliography

External links
 Seven Seas Mariner at Regent Seven Seas Cruises website

Cruise ships
Ships built by Chantiers de l'Atlantique
2000 ships